Rubens Antonio Dias (born 21 June 2001), known as just Rubens, is a Brazilian professional footballer who plays as a midfielder for Atlético Mineiro.

Career
Born in Tumiritinga, Rubens joined the youth academy of Atlético Mineiro in 2016, winning the Campeonato Brasileiro Sub-20 title in 2020.

On 7 March 2021, Rubens made his professional debut in a Campeonato Mineiro 4–0 home win over Uberlândia. On 25 June 2022, he scored his first goal as a professional in a Campeonato Brasileiro 3–2 home win over Fortaleza.

Career statistics

Honours
Atlético Mineiro
Campeonato Brasileiro Série A: 2021
Copa do Brasil: 2021
Campeonato Mineiro: 2021, 2022
Supercopa do Brasil: 2022
Campeonato Brasileiro Sub-20: 2020

References

External links
 

2001 births
Living people
Brazilian footballers
Association football midfielders
Campeonato Brasileiro Série A players
Clube Atlético Mineiro players